Macleod was a territorial electoral district for the Legislative Assembly of Northwest Territories, Canada.

The riding was created by royal proclamation in 1885 and abolished in 1905 when the provinces of Alberta and Saskatchewan were created.

Members of the Legislative Assembly (MLAs)

1885 election

1887 by-election

The by-election was held after Viscount Richard Henry Boyle resigned his seat.

1888 election

1891 election

1894 election

1897 election

By-election was held to confirm Mr. Haultain to his appointment as Premier of the Northwest Territories

1898 election

1902 election

References

External links 
The Legislative Assembly of Northwest Territories

Former electoral districts of Northwest Territories